Mayaki Seydou (born 1949) is a former Nigerien bantamweight boxer. Seydou competed at the 1972 Summer Olympics for Niger. In his first match, Seydou beat Turkey's Mehmet Kunova before losing to East Germany's Stefan Förster.

1972 Olympic results
Below are the results of Mayaki Seydou, a bantamweight boxer from Niger who competed at the 1972 Munich Olympics:

 Round of 64: defeated Mehmet Kunova (Turkey) by decision, 3-2
 Round of 32: lost to Stefan Forster (East Germany) by decision, 0-5

References

1949 births
Living people
Nigerien male boxers
Olympic boxers of Niger
Bantamweight boxers
Boxers at the 1972 Summer Olympics